The National Infrastructure Security Co-ordination Centre (NISCC) was an inter-departmental centre of the UK government.

Set up in 1999. The role of NISCC (pronounced "nicey") was to minimise the risk to critical national infrastructure (CNI) from electronic attack. NISCC provided advice and information on computer network defence and other information assurance issues.

On 1 February 2007, NISCC merged with the National Security Advice Centre (NSAC) to form the Centre for the Protection of National Infrastructure (CPNI). CPNI now provides integrated (combining information, personnel, and physical) security advice to the businesses and organisations which make up the national infrastructure. Through the delivery of this advice, they protect the UK national security by helping to reduce the vulnerability of the national infrastructure to terrorism and other threats.

See also
 British intelligence agencies
 National Cyber Security Centre (United Kingdom)
 US-CERT

References

External links
 Centre for the Protection of National Infrastructure
 GovCertUK

1999 establishments in the United Kingdom
2007 disestablishments in the United Kingdom
Computer security organizations
Cybercrime in the United Kingdom
Defunct public bodies of the United Kingdom
Government agencies established in 1999
Government agencies disestablished in 2007
Information technology organisations based in the United Kingdom
National security of the United Kingdom